Jazzaway is a Norwegian record label founded by saxophonist Jon Klette in Oslo, Norway.  He is also the main composer/leader in the band Jazzmob. Their CD Pathfinder (2003) was the first release from the label.

The label includes artists and bands such as Crimetime Orchestra, Jazzmob, Morthana, The Core and Sonny Simmons.

Roster
 Anders Aarum
 Bushman's Revenge
 Close Erase
 Dingobats
 Eirik Hegdal
 Jazzmob
 Jon Eberson
 Lucian Ban
 Per Zanussi
 Sam Newsome
 Sonny Simmons
 Svein Olav Herstad
 The Core
 Trondheim Jazz Orchestra

See also 
 List of record labels

References

External links
 Official site

Norwegian record labels
Jazz record labels